Kim Song-chol (born 30 November 1993) is a North Korean male weightlifter, who competed in the 62 kg category and represented North Korea at international competitions. 

He won the gold medal at the 2010 Summer Youth Olympics.

Major results

References

External links

1993 births
Living people
North Korean male weightlifters
Place of birth missing (living people)
Weightlifters at the 2010 Summer Youth Olympics
Youth Olympic gold medalists for North Korea